The 2018 BWF World Tour, officially known as the 2018 HSBC BWF World Tour for sponsorship reasons, was the first season of the BWF World Tour of badminton, a circuit of 26 tournaments which led up to the World Tour Finals tournament. It replaced the BWF Super Series and BWF Grand Prix, which was held from 2007 to 2017. 

It had 27 tournaments, which were divided into five levels: Level 1 was the said World Tour Finals, Level 2 called Super 1000 (three tournaments), Level 3 called Super 750 (five tournaments), Level 4 called Super 500 (seven tournaments) and Level 5 called Super 300 (11 tournaments). Each of these tournaments offered different ranking points and prize money. The highest points and prize pool were offered at the Super 1000 level (including the World Tour Finals). 

One other category of tournament, the BWF Tour Super 100 (level 6), also offered BWF World Tour ranking points. BWF Tour Super 100 was an important part of the pathway and entry point for players into the BWF World Tour tournaments. When the 11 Level 6 grade tournaments of the BWF Tour Super 100 were included, the complete tour consisted of 38 tournaments.

Results
Below is the schedule released by the Badminton World Federation:

Key

Winners

Finals

January

February

March

April

May

June

July

August

September

October

November

December

Statistics

Performance by countries
Below are the 2018 BWF World Tour performances by countries. Only countries who have won a title are listed:

BWF World Tour

BWF Tour Super 100

Finalists in six or more World Tour tournaments 

Updated after 2018 BWF World Tour Finals.

Titles in four or more World Tour tournaments 

Updated after 2018 BWF World Tour Finals.

World Tour Finals rankings 
The points were calculated from the following levels:
BWF World Tour Super 1000,
BWF World Tour Super 750, 
BWF World Tour Super 500, 
BWF World Tour Super 300 (except Korea Masters), 
BWF Tour Super 100.

Men's singles

Women's singles

Men's doubles

Women's doubles

Mixed doubles

References

 
World Tour
BWF World Tour